Rosalía Peredo Aguilar (born 4 December 1951) is a Mexican politician who currently serves in the upper house of Congress. Although she is a current member of the National Action Party (PAN), most of her political experience comes from center and center-left political parties.

Political career
Peredo holds a bachelor's degree in political science and administration.  She was an active member of the Worker's Revolutionary Party (PRT) and in 1985, was elected a PRT federal deputy, serving during the LIII Legislature of Congress (1985–1988). Peredo left the PRT and joined the Labor Party (PT), serving again in the Chamber of Deputies, this time representing the PT during the LVIII Legislature.

In 2006 she left the PT to run as the National Action Party candidate for the Senate representing the State of Tlaxcala; she secured that state's first minority seat.

References

External links
Official Website

Living people
Members of the Chamber of Deputies (Mexico)
Members of the Senate of the Republic (Mexico)
National Action Party (Mexico) politicians
Women members of the Senate of the Republic (Mexico)
Rosalia Peredo
Workers' Revolutionary Party (Mexico) politicians
21st-century Mexican politicians
21st-century Mexican women politicians
Women members of the Chamber of Deputies (Mexico)
National Autonomous University of Mexico alumni
Academic staff of the Chapingo Autonomous University
20th-century Mexican politicians
20th-century Mexican women politicians
People from Toluca
Politicians from Mexico City
1951 births